Dai Jun may refer to:
 Dai Jun (swimmer)
 Dai Jun (speed skater)